Money in the Bank may refer to:

Money in the Bank (novel), a 1942 comedy novel by P. G. Wodehouse
Money in the Bank ladder match, a professional wrestling match held since 2005
WWE Money in the Bank, an annual professional wrestling event based on the above match type
Money in the Bank, 1979 Australian TV film starring Tom Richards

Music
"Money in the Bank" (John Anderson song), 1993
"Money in the Bank" (Lil Scrappy song), 2006
"Money in the Bank" (Swizz Beatz song), 2007
Money in the Bank, rap mixtape series by Lloyd Banks hosted by DJ Whoo Kid